
Gmina Sztutowo is a rural gmina (administrative district) in Nowy Dwór Gdański County, Pomeranian Voivodeship, in northern Poland.

The gmina contains part of the protected area called Vistula Spit Landscape Park.

Villages
Gmina Sztutowo contains the villages and settlements of Doły, Dublewo, Graniczna, Grochowo Drugie, Grochowo Pierwsze, Grochowo Trzecie, Groszkowo, Kąty Rybackie, Kobyla Kępa, Łaszka, Płonina, Przyłap, Skowronki, Sztutowo, Sztutowska Kępa and Wydmina.

Neighbouring gminas
Gmina Sztutowo is bordered by the town of Krynica Morska and by the gminas of Nowy Dwór Gdański, Stegna and Tolkmicko.

References
 Polish official population figures 2006

Sztutowo
Nowy Dwór Gdański County